Chodov is a Prague Metro station on the second section of Line C. It was opened on 7 November 1980 as part of the extension from Kačerov to Kosmonautů (currently Háje).

The station is located under Roztylská Street in the southwestern part of the Chodov district. It is a shallow sub-surface station with a straight ceiling and an island platform 10 m below ground level. Centrum Chodov, the largest shopping centre in the Czech Republic, was built next to the station in 2005.

The station was named Budovatelů until 1990.

References

Prague Metro stations
Railway stations opened in 1980
1980 establishments in Czechoslovakia
Chodov (Prague)
Railway stations in the Czech Republic opened in the 20th century